Atrevidos was a program produced and broadcast by TC Television. It was hosted by Gabriela Pazmiño. The program was also broadcast over the Internet, the leader of the DUAL was Fernanda Gallardo. On Tuesday, November 4, 2014 it debuted and ended unexpectedly April 2, 2015.

First Season (2014-2015) 
The first season began on November 4, 2014 with two teams, Eagles and Tigers, who were 6 participants each. The program ended on April 2, 2015 with no winner since early February alone were transmitted several mini-reality shows, the penultimate day said the teams were dissolved and only the end of the last would be mini-reality called "La Sharon de Oro"

Teams 

The first teams of Bold (Atrevidos) were:

Final Break

Indefinite break 

TC Television, reduced the horary of Atrevidos for 2 hours to 45 minutes for the premiere of the soup ophera  Niche  that week Jonathan Gonzalez left the reality. After this, and due to the death of singer "Sharon the Witch", TC Television paid tribute with a reality within  Bold  called The Cumbiaton of Sharon from January until now there have been several mini-realities in the program, because of this some participants to see slow competition, decided to leave the program and are currently only six as models and members of the original equipment.

Unfinished Competition 
In the last of the  mini-realities  called "The Sharon Gold" was announced that Bold would not end and only do the mini-reality, so the teams were dissolved and there was never a winner, The Participants who finished the season were: Marla Suarez, Julian Campos, Valeria Chavarria, Andrea Fuentes and JC Palma. Julian Campos is currently a participant of Calle 7 Ecuador in TC Television.

References 

Ecuadorian television shows
TC Televisión original programming